Modou Diagne (born 3 January 1994) is a Senegalese professional footballer who played for Cypriot club Olympiakos Nicosia. As a youth, he was capped for the France U20 team, but switched to Senegal U23 team for the 2015 Africa U-23 Cup of Nations. He also holds French citizenship.

References

External links
 
 
 
 

1994 births
Living people
People from Diourbel Region
Association football defenders
Senegalese footballers
Senegal youth international footballers
French footballers
France youth international footballers
French sportspeople of Senegalese descent
AS Nancy Lorraine players
R. Charleroi S.C. players
Olympiakos Nicosia players
Ligue 2 players
2015 Africa U-23 Cup of Nations players